The City of Vaughan 2006 Municipal Election took place on November 13, 2006.  One mayor, three regional councillors and five local councillors were elected for the city of Vaughan, Ontario, Canada.  In addition, local school trustees were elected to the York Region District School Board, York Catholic District School Board, Conseil scolaire de district du Centre-Sud-Ouest and Conseil scolaire de district catholique Centre-Sud.  These elections were held in conjunction with all other municipalities across Ontario, which for the first time elected politicians to four year terms, rather than three years as had previously been the case. (see 2006 Ontario municipal elections).

Results
The 2006 municipal election in Vaughan saw a number of major upsets and a number of other close races - contrary to past results in the city elections. All but one incumbent were re-elected.

Mayor
In the Mayoral race, former Regional Councillor Linda Jackson unseated incumbent Mayor and former Regional Councillor Michael Di Biase. This was the first time since the incorporation of the City of Vaughan that an incumbent mayor had been defeated. Jackson took the place of her mother, Lorna Jackson who had held the position before she succumbed to cancer prior to Di Biase's tenure.  After the final results came in, Di Biase called for a recount due to the extremely close result . However, he later called off the recount and filed an application for an injunction in the Ontario Superior Court requesting that the election be declared “illegal and void”   for a number of reasons including faulty vote-counting machines. On November 22, Di Biase again reversed his decision, asking City Council to support a recount.
The results of the recount were released Nov. 30.
Jackson was once again declared mayor with 28,402 votes over Di Biase's 28,308.

Regional Councillors
With Jackson no longer serving as a Regional Councillor, only two incumbents ran for that position, Mario Ferri and Joyce Frustaglio. In a surprise result, Frustaglio took first place in the race, making her the Deputy Mayor, a post held since Di Biase became Mayor by Mario Ferri. The third position was filled by a former Local and Regional Councillor, Gino Rosati.

Local Councillors
All five Ward Councilor positions were won by the incumbents, with many difficult challenges coming from former city staff and councillors.

Potential issues
 Construction of the Thornhill Wal-Mart Mall 
 Corporate donations to members of council
 Lack of a public hospital
 Mayoral and councillor salaries
 Traffic Gridlock
 New $96.3 Million Civic Centre construction, contracts and costs

Candidates

Mayor

Regional Council

Because Joyce Frustaglio received the highest vote count among the candidates for Regional Councillor, she is styled as the acting Mayor in cases where the Mayor is unavailable.  However commonly confused, this is a different role than being the Deputy Mayor

Local Council

Ward 1

Ward 2

Ward 3

Ward 4

Ward 5

Withdrawals
 Mario G. Racco (nomination withdrawn from Ward 4 on Jan. 20)
 Aurelio E. Acquaviva (nomination withdrawn from Ward 1 on Aug 15, moved to Ward 2)
 Robert Craig (nomination withdrawn from Mayor on Aug 28, moved to Regional Councillor)
 Stan Grabowski (nomination withdrawn from Ward 2 on Sept. 27)
 Gino Ruffolo (nomination withdrawn from Mayor on Oct. 2)

Controversy 
Following the November 2006 election, former mayor Michael Di Biase appealed the results of the elections citing possible errors in the ballot counting machines. The results were reviewed following a decision in his favour in Ontario Superior Court, concluding that the original result, the election of Jackson as mayor, was the correct one.

References
 Vaughan Citizen article on election
 Vaughan Citizen article on mayoral candidates
 Globe and Mail report on Municipal salaries
 
 Vaughan Citizen article "Online clash packs big 'byte'"
Toronto Star article on Go Vote Vaughan about releasing names of contributors prior to election day
York Region article on Corporate Donations to members of council
Vaughan Citizen follow-up to the 'online clash' Wikipedia story
Toronto Star article Ending GTA traffic gridlock tops wish list for seething motorists
Debate heats up over corporate donations
 Toronto Star, Vaughan election heats up already
Toronto Star, Trying to Avoid the Tender Trap
New mall to mimic community; Wal-Mart to get Main Street facelift

Trivia
 An article on website Wikipedia entitled "Vaughan municipal election, 2006" was cited as an issue in the campaign; the Vaughan Citizen newspaper has, to date, published two articles about opposing allegations of politically biased edits to this article.
 The 2006 Vaughan municipal election has the largest percentage of female candidates (27.3%) in the province.  Nine out of thirty three candidates are women.  It is possible for women to win every seat with the exception of one of the regional council seats and the Ward 5 council seat although it is still possible for men to win every seat.
The average salary of Vaughan councillors is $102,657, compared to Toronto councillors at $85,497.

References

External links
 Vaughan Votes 2006

2006 Ontario municipal elections
Politics of Vaughan